Khandpara State was one of the princely states of India during the period of the British Raj. It was located in present-day Nayagarh district, Odisha.

The state was bounded in the north by the Mahanadi River. The main town was Kantilo, but the capital was at Khandpara (Khandapada).

History
Khandpara State is said to be founded by Jadunath Singh Mangaraj, the youngest son of Raja Raghunath Singh of Nayagarh, who retained possession of four Garhs or forts, as his share, viz. Kadua, Ghuntasahi, Saradhapur, and Khedapada, which are located in Nayagarh region. Jadunath Singh is also said to have received the title Mangaraj from the Gajapati Maharaja. In the reign of Raja Narayan Singh Mangraj, Khandpara extended on the east up to Banki, on the west to Balaramprasad in Daspalla, on the north to Kantilo, and on the south up to Jogiapali.

The last ruler signed the instrument of accession to the Indian Union on 1 January 1948, merging his state into Odisha forming a part of the Nayagarh district.

Rulers
The rulers of Khandpara State bore the title of Raja. The emblem of the Khandpara royal family was the head of a tiger; state symbols were identical in neighboring Nayagarh State.

Jadunath Singh Mangaraj (1599 – 1675)
Narayan Singh Mangaraj (1675 – 1709)
Balunkeshwar Singh Mangaraj (1709 – 1723)
Banamali Singh Mardaraj Bhramarbar Rai (1723 – 1732)
Bairagi Singh Mardaraj Bhramarbar Rai (1734 – 1770)
Niladri Singh Mardaraj Bhramarbar Rai (1770 – 1794)
Narasimha Singh Mardaraj Bhramarbar Rai (1794 – 1815)
Purushottam Mardaraj Bhramarbar Rai (1815 – 1821)
Krushna Chandra Singh Bhramarbar Rai (1821 – 1842)
Kunja Bihari Singh Bhramarbar Rai (1842 – 28 February 1867)
Natabar Mardaraj Bhramarbar Rai (28 February 1867 – 1905)
Ram Chandra Singh Mardaraj Bhramarbar Rai (1905 – 26 December 1922)
Harihar Singh Mardaraj Bhramarbar Rai (26 December 1922 – 1 January 1948)

Titular
Harihar Singh Mardaraj Bhramarbar Rai (1 January 1948 – 1977)
Bibhuti Bhusan Singh Mardaraj Bhramarbar Rai (1977 – current)

See also
 Eastern States Agency
 Political integration of India

References

Princely states of Odisha
History of Odisha
Nayagarh district
1599 establishments in India
1948 disestablishments in India